Rutherford v Secretary of State for Work and Pensions is a case currently before the Supreme Court of the United Kingdom. The case concerns the application of the "bedroom tax" to a family who care for their disabled grandson who suffers from Potocki-Shaffer Syndrome.

See also
Discretionary Housing Payment

References

External links
Royal Court of Justice judgment

Under-occupancy penalty
Supreme Court of the United Kingdom cases